Phineas White (October 30, 1770July 6, 1847) was an American lawyer and politician. He served as United States Representative from Vermont.

Biography 
White was born in South Hadley in the Province of Massachusetts Bay to Deacon Enoch White and Esther Stevens. He graduated from Dartmouth College in Hanover, New Hampshire in 1797.

He studied law with Charles Marsh of Woodstock, Vermont and Judge Samuel Porter of Dummerston, Vermont. He was admitted to the bar in 1800 and commenced practice in Pomfret. White married Elizabeth Stevens on July 5, 1801.

He was Register of Probate for Windsor County from 1800 to 1809, postmaster of Putney from 1802 to 1809 and county attorney in 1813. White served as judge of Windham County in 1814, 1815 and 1817, and was chief judge from 1818 to 1820. White was probate judge of the Westminster district from 1814 to 1815.

White was a member of the state constitutional convention in 1814 and served in the Vermont House of Representatives from 1815 to 1820. He was elected as a Democratic-Republican to the Seventeenth Congress, and served from March 4, 1821 to March 3, 1823. White was again a member of the state constitutional convention in 1836 and also served in the Vermont Senate in 1836 and 1837.

White served as a trustee of Middlebury College, President of the Vermont Bible Society, and President of the Vermont Colonization Society. He belonged to the Masonic Order and was Grand Master of the Grand Lodge of Vermont.

Death
White died on July 6, 1847, in Putney, Vermont and was buried in Maple Grove Cemetery.

References

External links
 

govtrack.us

The Political Graveyard
Digital Collections at Middlebury
ancestry.com

1770 births
1847 deaths
Dartmouth College alumni
Vermont lawyers
People from South Hadley, Massachusetts
People from Pomfret, Vermont
Members of the Vermont House of Representatives
Vermont state senators
Vermont state court judges
Democratic-Republican Party members of the United States House of Representatives from Vermont
Burials in Vermont
19th-century American lawyers